Two ships of the United States Navy have been named USS Cowpens, after the Battle of Cowpens, an American victory during the American Revolutionary War.

 , was a light aircraft carrier active in World War II and decommissioned in 1946.
 , is a guided missile cruiser commissioned in 1991 and currently on active service.

Sources

United States Navy ship names